Kew Cricket Club plays matches on Kew Green in Kew, which is now in the London Borough of Richmond upon Thames.

The club was formed in 1882 following the amalgamation of two local clubs, Kew Oxford Cricket Club and Kew Cambridge Cricket Club, but cricket had been played on Kew Green for many years before this.  In August 1732, the Whitehall Evening Post reported that Frederick, Prince of Wales attended "a great cricket match" at Kew on Thursday 27 July. A report in The London Evening Post dated 16 July 1737 refers to a match between a Prince of Wales XI and The Duke of Marlborough XI.

Current activities
Today's Kew Cricket Club has four Saturday League teams, a Sunday League team and a Sunday friendly team. Kew Cricket Club operates a thriving Colts section, fielding league teams at the U17 (under 17 years of age), U15, U13 and U11 levels.
The current 1st XI team plays in Division 1 of the Thames Valley Cricket League. The 1st and 2nd XI teams play their cricket matches at Kew Cricket Club Ground on Kew Green, and the 3rd and 4th XIs play at St Mary's University's grounds in Teddington.

A charity cricket match takes place annually, each May bank holiday.

History

 1732 – Frederick, Prince of Wales, attended "a great cricket match" at Kew on Thursday 27 July
 1737 – Cricket was first reported on Kew Green
 1824 – Kew Green was enclosed by Private Act of Parliament
 1853 – The Windsor and Eton Express reported that a meeting had been held at the Rose and Crown pub to re-establish the Kew Cambridge Cricket Club
 1855 – Bell's Life in London and Sporting Chronicle referred to "Kew Cambridge Cricket Ground" as the venue for a match between the Goodenough House School Club and Clifden House that took place on 16 May
 1868 – The Windsor and Eton Express reported that despite being said to have included four professional players, a Kew United Cricket Club team had lost a match at Kew Green on 9 July against the Slough and Upton Cricket Club
 1876 – Kew Cambridge Cricket Club was given permission to cordon off the wicket
 1881 – Kew Cambridge Cricket Club and Kew Oxford Cricket Club amalgamated to form Kew Cricket Club
 1962 – Kew Cricket Club was given permission to erect a pavilion
 1964 – Pavilion was opened
 1966 – Sunday cricket was allowed on Kew Green for the first time
 1973 – Jamaica played New Zealand on Kew Cricket Club's ground in the 1973 Women's Cricket World Cup; however, the match was abandoned due to rain

References

Further reading
 M Burgess (ed.) (1982). Kew Cricket Club 1882–1982. London: Kew Cricket Club, 32pp

External links
Official website
Kew Cricket Club Ground on Cricinfo

1732 in England
1737 in England
1732 in sports
1737 in sports
1882 establishments in England
Cricket grounds in London
English club cricket teams
English cricket teams in the 18th century
Kew, London
Kew Green
Sport in the London Borough of Richmond upon Thames
Sports clubs in London
Sports venues completed in 1973
St Mary's University, Twickenham